Christophe Le Mével (born 11 September 1980 in Lannion) is a French former road racing cyclist, who competed professionally between 2002 and 2014 for the , ,  and  teams.

Le Mével left  at the end of the 2012 season, and joined  on a two-year contract from the 2013 season onwards. He retired in November 2014.

Major results

2001
 1st Overall Ronde de l'Isard
 8th Paris–Bourges
 10th Gran Premio della Liberazione
2003
 1st Mountains classification Tour de l'Avenir
2004
 3rd Overall Tour de l'Avenir
 9th Classic Loire Atlantique
 10th Polynormande
2005
 1st Stage 16 Giro d'Italia
 2nd Overall Paris–Corrèze
2009
 9th Overall Tour du Haut Var
 9th Overall Tour de France
 10th Overall 2009 Paris–Nice
 10th Overall Critérium du Dauphiné Libéré
2010
 1st  Overall Tour du Haut Var
1st Stage 2
 2nd Road race, National Road Championships
2011
 7th Giro di Toscana
 8th GP Miguel Induráin
 9th La Flèche Wallonne
2012
 4th Clásica de San Sebastián
 7th Overall Tour du Haut Var
 8th Japan Cup
2013
 8th Tour du Finistère
2014
 6th Grand Prix de la Ville de Lillers

Grand Tour general classification results timeline

References

External links

French male cyclists
French Giro d'Italia stage winners
People from Lannion
1980 births
Living people
Sportspeople from Côtes-d'Armor
Cyclists from Brittany